India Adams (March 5, 1927 – April 25, 2020) was an American singer, known as the ghost singer who dubbed the singing voices of Cyd Charisse and Joan Crawford in the mid-1950s.

Career
She dubbed the singing voices for Charisse in The Band Wagon (1953). That same year, she also dubbed for Crawford in Torch Song.

Adams lived in England from 1965 to 1981, and in 1969–1970, was the standby to Ginger Rogers for the West End stage production of Mame at the Theatre Royal, Drury Lane, London.

In 1991, together with two other prominent ghost singers, Jo Ann Greer and Annette Warren, she starred in the cabaret revue Voices, produced by Alan Eichler, under the musical direction of John McDaniel, at the Hollywood Roosevelt Hotel.

After spending another twenty years out of the public eye, Adams reappeared in early 1991, when she performed with several other singers at the Catalina Bar and Grill. She still remained active performing in clubs and musicals.

Personal life and death 
Adams married advertising executive Jack Stanley in 1951. Adams died at the age of 93 on April 25, 2020.

Discography
 India Adams Sings!
 1959: Comfort Me with Apples – with Ray Martin and His Orchestra (RCA Victor)
 India Adams Sings Again

References

External links
 
 India Adams homepage

Singers from Los Angeles
1927 births
2020 deaths
21st-century American women singers
21st-century American singers